The Leader of the House ( – ) is responsible for managing and scheduling Government business in the Jatiya Sangsad. The office is always held by the Prime Minister of Bangladesh. The Leader of the House and the Deputy Leader are  elected by a majority of the members of the parliament.

The duties of the Deputy Leader of the House is largely contingent, coming into play only when the Leader of the House is absent from the House or is on leave. At that point the Deputy Leader is referred to as Acting Leader of the House.

List of Leaders of the House
Political parties

See also
 Leader of the Opposition (Bangladesh)

References

1973 establishments in Bangladesh
Parliament of Bangladesh
Legislative leaders
Lists of political office-holders in Bangladesh